The 1985 Texas Longhorns football team represented the University of Texas at Austin in the 1985 NCAA Division I-A football season.  The Longhorns finished the regular season with an 8–3 record and lost to Air Force in the Bluebonnet Bowl.

Schedule

Personnel

References

Texas
Texas Longhorns football seasons
Texas Longhorns football